Josu Hernáez Lopetegui (born 4 July 1985) is a Spanish footballer who plays as a forward.

Football career
Born in Eibar, Gipuzkoa, Basque Country, Hernáez played for SD Eibar's youth setup before eventually joining seven-a-side football. In the 2004 summer he moved to SCD Durango, and made his debuts as a senior during the campaign, in Tercera División. In 2006, he returned to Eibar, being assigned to the main squad in Segunda División B.

On 13 July 2007 Hernáez joined Athletic Bilbao, being assigned to the reserves also in the third level. However, after featuring rarely with the Lions, he moved to another reserve team, Real Zaragoza B on 18 January of the following year.

In September 2008 Hernáez suffered a serious knee injury which took him out of the entire 2008–09 season. He was later released by the Aragonese, and moved to Sestao River Club in the 2009 summer.

On 29 August 2014 Hernáez joined Segunda División's CD Mirandés. He made his professional debut on 14 September, aged 29, playing the entire second half in a 0–1 away loss against CD Tenerife.

References

External links
 
 
 
 

1985 births
Living people
Spanish footballers
Footballers from Eibar
Association football forwards
Segunda División players
Segunda División B players
Tercera División players
SD Eibar footballers
Bilbao Athletic footballers
Real Zaragoza B players
Sestao River footballers
CD Mirandés footballers
Real Unión footballers